Lee Eun-ju (Hangul: ,; born March 5, 1999) is a South Korean artistic gymnast who represents her nation at international competitions. She won the bronze medal in the team event at the 2015 Asian Artistic Gymnastics Championships. She competed at the 2016 Gymnastics Olympic Test Event and was chosen to represent her country at the 2016 Summer Olympics after their initial choice, Lee Go-im, was injured in training. Lee placed 53 in the all-around qualification, her best result being a 13.500 on the uneven bars.

Lee came into the limelight during the 2016 Olympics after she took a selfie alongside North Korean gymnast Hong Un-jong.

Lee's mother is Japanese while her father is Korean. She was born in Shimonoseki, Japan and moved to South Korea in 2013.

Career
Lee's senior international debut came at the Asian Championships in Hiroshima, Japan, where she helped South Korea win team bronze. She was passed over for the South Korean team for the World Championships that fall, but was named to the team for the Olympic Test Event the following April. South Korea placed eighth and did not qualify a full team to the Olympics.

Following the Test Event, she competed at the South Korean National Championships, winning uneven bars and balance beam gold, and all-around, vault, and floor exercise silver. She was initially named the alternate for the Olympics in Rio de Janeiro, Brazil, until her compatriot Lee Go-Im suffered an injury in training. Lee was subbed in to take her place.

2016 Olympics
Lee competed in the first subdivision of qualifications, starting on floor exercise. She placed fifty-third in the all-around, fifty-seventh on uneven bars, sixty-eighth on floor exercise, and seventieth on balance beam.

Despite winning no medals, she made worldwide headline after captured on camera taking a selfie with her North Korean counterpart, Hong Un-jong. A Reuters picture of the two smiling women was praised for capturing the spirit of the Games. 
IOC President Thomas Bach called the selfie a "great gesture".

Medal count

References

External links
 
 
 
 https://thegymter.net/category/lee-eun-ju/
 http://www.elle.com/culture/career-politics/a38347/north-and-south-korean-gymnasts-adorable-selfies-rio/

1999 births
Living people
South Korean female artistic gymnasts
People from Shimonoseki
Gymnasts at the 2016 Summer Olympics
Olympic gymnasts of South Korea
South Korean people of Japanese descent
Japanese people of South Korean descent
Gymnasts at the 2018 Asian Games
Asian Games competitors for Japan